Proline-rich membrane anchor 1, also known as PRiMA, is a protein that in humans is encoded by the PRIMA1 gene.

Function 

PRiMA functions to organize acetylcholinesterase (AChE) into tetramers, and to anchor AChE at neural cell membranes. This is accomplished by the proline rich anchor domain (PRAD) of PRIMA1 which anchors the tetramer of AChE into the plasma membrane of neural cells and myocytes. The PRAD interacts with the C-terminal T-peptide of AChE.

PRiMA plays a role in targeting AChE to the cell surface and, in neuroblastoma cells, PRiMA the limiting factor of such targeting. In both mice and humans, PRiMA exists as two alternative splice variants that differ in their cytoplasmic regions.

Clinical significance 

The severity of neurogenerative diseases, such as Alzheimer’s, can be related to the degradation of AChE.

References

Further reading